The Bentonia school, a style of guitar-playing sometimes attributed to blues players from Bentonia, Mississippi, features a shared repertoire of songs, guitar tunings and chord-voicings with a distinctively minor tonality not found in other styles of blues music.

While not all blues musicians from Bentonia played in this style, one particular blues player, Skip James (1902–1969), had a distinct, complicated, and highly sophisticated style that veered from typical blues guitar playing. His style became known as Bentonia School.

James became the most well-known of the small pool of musicians associated with the Bentonia School.  Others include Jack Owens,  Jimmy "Duck" Holmes, and the un-recorded Henry Stuckey. Both James' and Owens' styles featured haunting minor chords and droning strings which, in comparison to the music of many other blues musicians, ring with an ominous and eerie feel.

The Bentonia school of guitar playing has strong associations with a guitar-tuning based on an open E minor chord.  From the lowest (6th) string to the highest (1st), the tuning uses E-B-E-G-B-E.  (A common variant pitches the same intervals a whole step lower, in D minor: D-A-D-F-A-D.)  Although other blues musicians in a range of styles used this tuning (Booker "Bukka" White, Albert Collins, Arthur "Big Boy" Crudup, Henry Townsend and others), the Bentonia musicians used it to great effect, achieving a distinctive tonality unique to the region.

References

External links
 bentoniablues.com – Mission Statement: “Anything Bentonia Blues.” To foster communication among those who love and appreciate the Bentonia School of Delta Blues.
 Video: Jimmy Duck Holmes keeping the Bentonia Blues alive
 Discovery Channel “I Am The Blues”. A musical journey through the Louisiana Bayou, the juke joints of Mississippi Delta and Beltonia, Mississippi Hill country. A tour of the Chitlin’ Circuit with Bobby Rush and other blues legends.

Films
Deep Blues (1991).  Directed by Robert Mugge.

Guitar performance techniques
Blues